Ashwood Hall was a Southern plantation in Maury County, Tennessee.

Location
The plantation was located in Ashwood, a small town near Columbia in Maury County, Tennessee.

History
The land belonged to Colonel William Polk. The mansion was built for one of his sons, Bishop Leonidas Polk, from 1833 to 1837. Opposite the mansion, Leonidas Polk built St. John's Episcopal Church from 1839 to 1842.

In 1847, Leonidas Polk sold the mansion to Rebecca Van Leer, an heiress to an iron fortune and member of the Van Leer family, who had married one of his brothers, Andrew Jackson Polk, in 1846, for US$35,000. Andrew and his wife spent another US$35,000 on expansions and refurbishments. Their son Vanleer Polk and their daughter Antoinette Van Leer Polk grew up at the mansion.

On July 5, 1861, at the outset of the American Civil War, Andrew Jackson Polk, who was elected Captain, organized the Maury County Braves in a grove on the grounds of Ashwood Hall.

In 1862, Antoinette Polk saved Confederate personnel stationed at Ashwood Hall by warning them that Northern forces were coming their way. As a result, she became known as a "Southern heroine."

It burned down in 1874.

See also
Hamilton Place (Columbia, Tennessee)
Rattle and Snap

References

Houses in Maury County, Tennessee
Plantation houses in Tennessee
Houses completed in 1837
Leonidas Polk
Buildings and structures demolished in 1874
Burned houses in the United States